Jacob Herzfeld was a German theatre director and actor. He was admired by Goethe and Schiller and corresponded with both, and became known as the first serious Jewish actor on the German stage.

References

Jewish German male actors
1763 births
1826 deaths
People from Dessau-Roßlau